Human liquor means waste content from bowels isolated to investigate specific enzymes and peptidases involved in enteric contraction and digestion of compounds.

P-endopeptidase isolated from human liquor inactivates tachykinins.  Hydrolysis of Substance P by P-endopeptidase yields the active fragment of substance P.  A neuroactive peptide, Substance P is found throughout the central and peripheral nervous system.  It has mostly been studied for its contractive effect on enteric musculature.

References
 Nyberg et al. 1984

Physiology